Robert Bainbridge (5 January 1897 – 1967) was an English footballer who made 35 appearances in the Football League playing for Lincoln City. He played as a goalkeeper. He also played 37 times for Lincoln in the Midland League, and played non-league football for Jarrow, Sittingbourne, Gateshead Town and Leadgate Park.

References

1897 births
1967 deaths
Sportspeople from Jarrow
Footballers from Tyne and Wear
Footballers from County Durham
English footballers
Association football goalkeepers
Jarrow F.C. players
Lincoln City F.C. players
Sittingbourne F.C. players
Gateshead Town F.C. players
Leadgate Park F.C. players
Midland Football League players
English Football League players
Place of death missing